is a Japanese attorney at law who specializes in consumer affairs, investment frauds and cases involving religious cults, especially Aleph (formerly known as Aum Shinrikyo) and Unification church. He regularly appears as a commentator on Japanese TV news and current affairs programs.

Career 
Kito was born November 21, 1960, in Ube, Yamaguchi, and is a graduate of Osaka University and Graduate School of Law and Politics of Osaka University. Kito is a head lawyer of Link Law Office Kito and Partners in Tokyo, established in 2001.

He is a member of the Consumer Affairs Committee in Japan Federation of Bar Associations.

He is the acting executive director of the National Network of Lawyers Against Spiritual Sales aims at providing legal assistance for victims of cult-related frauds.

On 26 August 2022, he became one of the members being elected to the "Spiritual Sales Review Committee" in the Consumer Affairs Agency for providing suggestions to regulate the Unification Church's predatory fundraising. The committee was established under the order of Digital Minister Taro Kono as the approval rating of Prime Minister Fumio Kishida's cabinet continued to plunge due to intense media scrutiny of the ties between his party with the church since the assassination of Shinzo Abe.

Predecessor 

Before Kito, victims of Unification Church and Aum Shinrikyo were represented by Tsutsumi Sakamoto, who was murdered, together with his family, by several members of Aum Shinrikyo.

Major publications 
 Mind Control (Risk in our lives) (2012, ASCOM)
  (Iwanami Shinsho Active) (2002) [Japanese]
 Religious Corporation Act for the 21st Century (Asahi News Shop) (1995) [Japanese]

See also
 Yoshihiro Yasuda

References

External links
  
 International Cultic Studies Association profile

Aum Shinrikyo
Critics of new religious movements
Psychological abuse
Osaka University
20th-century Japanese lawyers
1960 births
Living people
21st-century Japanese lawyers